Indo Gulf Fertilisers is an Indian company (a unit of Indorama India Pvt. Ltd which was under Aditya Birla Group, Aditya Birla Group divested this company to Indian unit of a Singaporean company. Indorama India Pvt Ltd took over the control of the India business in 2020.The company is located at Jagdishpur, near Lucknow in Uttar Pradesh. It owns one of India's most energy efficient manufacturing facilities.

Indo Gulf fertilisers participates bears an Indo Gulf Jan Sewa Trust Hospital, which caters the employees of factory and nearby population.

References

External links
 Official site

Fertilizer companies of India
Companies based in Uttar Pradesh
Manufacturing companies based in Mumbai
Companies with year of establishment missing